Shades of Green is an album by American jazz guitarist Grant Green featuring performances recorded in 1971 and released on the Blue Note label.

Reception

The Allmusic review by Michael Erlewine awarded the album 2 stars and stated "This is not the old Grant Green".

Track listing
 "Medley: I Don't Want Nobody to Give Me Nothing, (Open Up The Door I'll Get It Myself) / Cold Sweat" (James Brown) - 5:52
 "Sunrise, Sunset" (Jerry Bock, Sheldon Harnick) - 4:40
 "Never My Love" (Donald Adrissi, Richard Addrisi) - 4:30
 "Got to Be There" (Elliot Willensky) - 4:24
 "California Green" (Grant Green) - 6:24
 "If You Really Love Me" (Stevie Wonder, Syreeta Wright) - 4:25
 "Cast Your Fate to the Wind" (Vince Guaraldi) - 4:50
 "In the Middle" (Alfred Ellis, Buddy Hobgood) - 5:02
Recorded at  United Artists Studios, West Hollywood, CA on November 23 (tracks 1, 5 & 8), & November 24 (tracks 2-4, 6 & 7), 1971 with horn overdubs recorded at Rudy Van Gelder Studio, Englewood Cliffs, New Jersey on December 16 & 17, 1971

Personnel
Grant Green - guitar
Billy Wooten - vibes
Emmanuel Riggins - electric piano, clavinet
Wilton Felder - electric bass
Nesbert "Stix" Hooper - drums
King Errisson - conga
Harold Cardwell - percussion
Orchestra arranged by Wade Marcus
Joe Newman, Joe Wilder, Victor Paz, James Sedlar - trumpet
Harry DiVito - trombone
Dick Hickson - bass trombone
Jim Buffington - French horn
Phil Bodner, Romeo Penque, George Marge, John Leone - woodwinds
Technical
Christina Hersch - engineer
Rudy Van Gelder - remixing
Norman Seeff - art direction

References 

Blue Note Records albums
Grant Green albums
1971 albums
albums arranged by Wade Marcus
albums produced by George Butler (record producer)
Albums recorded at Van Gelder Studio